Lawrence Wright (born August 2, 1947) is an American writer and journalist, who is a staff writer for The New Yorker magazine, and fellow at the Center for Law and Security at the New York University School of Law. Wright is best known as the author of the 2006 nonfiction book Looming Tower: Al-Qaeda and the Road to 9/11. Wright is also known for his work with documentarian Alex Gibney who directed film versions of Wright's one man show My Trip to Al-Qaeda and his book Going Clear. His 2020 novel, The End of October, a thriller about a pandemic, was released in April 2020 during the COVID-19 pandemic, to generally positive reviews.

Background and education
Wright graduated from Woodrow Wilson High School in Dallas, Texas, in 1965 and was inducted into the school's Hall of Fame in 2009. He is a graduate of Tulane University and taught English at the American University in Cairo (from which he was awarded a Master of Arts in Applied Linguistics in 1969) in Egypt for two years.  Wright lives in Austin, Texas.

Career

In 1980, Wright began working for the magazine Texas Monthly and contributed to Rolling Stone magazine.  In late 1992, he joined the staff of The New Yorker.

The Looming Tower

Wright is the author of six books but is best known for his 2006 publication, The Looming Tower: Al-Qaeda and the Road to 9/11. A quick bestseller, The Looming Tower was awarded the J. Anthony Lukas Book Prize, the 2007 Pulitzer Prize for General Nonfiction, and is frequently referred to by some media pundits as being an excellent source of background information on Al Qaeda and the September 11 attacks. The book's title is a phrase from the : "Wherever you are, death will find you, even in the looming tower", which Osama bin Laden quoted three times in a videotaped speech seen as directed to the 9/11 hijackers.

Going Clear

In 2011, Wright wrote a profile of former Scientologist Paul Haggis for The New Yorker.

Starting with Haggis and eventually speaking with 200 current and former Scientologists, Wright's book, Going Clear: Scientology, Hollywood, and the Prison of Belief, was published in 2013. The book contains interviews from current and former Scientologists, and examines the history and leadership of the organisation. In an interview for The New York Times, Wright disclosed that he had received "innumerable" letters threatening legal action from lawyers representing the Church of Scientology and celebrities who were members of it. 

The New York Times published Michael Kinsley's review of the book, where he wrote: "That crunching sound you hear is Lawrence Wright bending over backward to be fair to Scientology. Every deceptive comparison with Mormonism and other religions is given a respectful hearing. Every ludicrous bit of church dogma is served up deadpan. This makes the book's indictment that much more powerful."

In 2015, Alex Gibney produced a documentary based on Wright's book, titled Going Clear: Scientology and the Prison of Belief. The film was nominated for seven Emmy Awards, winning three, and received a 2015 Peabody Award "for its detailed documentation of Scientology's history and abuses."

Other projects

Among Wright's other books are Remembering Satan: A Tragic Case of Recovered Memory (1994), about the Paul Ingram false memory case.  On June 7, 1996, Wright testified at Ingram's pardon hearing.

Wright co-wrote the screenplay for the film The Siege (1998), which tells the story of a terrorist attack in New York City that leads to curtailed civil liberties and rounding up of Arab-Americans. A script that Wright originally wrote for Oliver Stone was turned instead into a well-regarded Showtime movie, Noriega: God's Favorite (2000).

A documentary featuring Wright, My Trip to Al-Qaeda, premiered on HBO in September 2010. It was based on his journeys and experiences in the Middle East during his research for The Looming Tower. My Trip to Al-Qaeda looks at al-Qaeda, Islamist extremism, anti-American sentiment and the U.S. military presence in Afghanistan and Iraq and combines Wright's first-person narrative with documentary footage and photographs.

Wright plays the keyboard in the Austin, Texas, blues collective WhoDo.

Wright is also a playwright. He has worked on a script over several years concerning the making of the epic film Cleopatra that starred Elizabeth Taylor, Richard Burton, and Rex Harrison. The play is titled Cleo and was to have opened September 2017 in Houston, Texas, but was delayed by catastrophic flooding caused by hurricane Harvey. It eventually opened in April 2018.

Awards and honors
2006 Los Angeles Times Book Prize for The Looming Tower
2006 New York Times bestseller for The Looming Tower
2006 New York Times Notable Book of the Year for The Looming Tower
2006 New York Times Best Books of the Year for The Looming Tower
2006 IRE Award for The Looming Tower
2006 National Book Award finalist for The Looming Tower
2006 Los Angeles Times Book Prize finalist for The Looming Tower
2006 Time magazine's Best Books of the Year for The Looming Tower
2007 Pulitzer Prize for General Non-Fiction for The Looming Tower
2007 Helen Bernstein Book Award for Excellence in Journalism for The Looming Tower
2007 J. Anthony Lukas Book Prize for The Looming Tower
2007 Lionel Gelber Prize for The Looming Tower
2007 Arthur Ross Book Award shortlist for The Looming Tower
2007 PEN Center USA Literary Award (Research Nonfiction) for The Looming Tower
2009 Newsweek 50 Books for Our Times for The Looming Tower

2013 National Book Award for Nonfiction finalist for Going Clear
2013 National Book Critics Circle Award (Nonfiction) shortlist for Going Clear

2015 Primetime Emmy Award for Outstanding Documentary or Nonfiction Special.

Bibliography

Books
Non-fiction
 
 
 
 
 
 
 
 

God Save Texas: A Journey into the Soul of the Lone Star State. Alfred A. Knopf. 2018. .
The Plague Year: America in the Time of Covid. Alfred A. Knopf. 2021.
Fiction

Plays
 Camp David (premiered at Arena Stage (Washington, D.C.) in March 2014)

Essays and reporting

References

External links

 lawrencewright.com
 Lawrence Wright at The New Yorker
 
 Wright on NPR
 
 The Looming Tower Reviews  at Metacritic
 AuthorViews video interview about The Looming Tower
 Audio of Paul Ingram Pardon Hearing
 Lawrence Wright articles at Byliner
 Lawrence Wright Interview: Conversations with History; Institute of International Studies, UC Berkeley, November 12, 2006
 Reporting The Bin Laden Beat, Journalist Lawrence Wright Knows More About Al Qaeda's Leader Than Many CIA Operatives
 Lawrence Wright interviewed on Charlie Rose
 

American investigative journalists
Screenwriters from Texas
1947 births
Living people
Place of birth missing (living people)
Emmy Award winners
Pulitzer Prize for General Non-Fiction winners
The New Yorker people
The New Yorker staff writers
Historians of al-Qaeda
American expatriates in Egypt
The American University in Cairo alumni
Academic staff of The American University in Cairo
Tulane University alumni
Writers from Austin, Texas
American male dramatists and playwrights
American male journalists
American male novelists
American male screenwriters
20th-century American male writers
21st-century American male writers
20th-century American dramatists and playwrights
21st-century American dramatists and playwrights
20th-century American journalists
21st-century American journalists
20th-century American novelists
21st-century American non-fiction writers
Novelists from Texas
Critics of Scientology
New York University faculty